The Denial of Saint Peter may refer to:

 The Denial of Saint Peter (Caravaggio)
 The Denial of Saint Peter (Rembrandt)
 The Denial of Saint Peter (Hendrick ter Brugghen)